Lesticus drescheri is a species of ground beetle in the subfamily Pterostichinae. It was described by Andrewes in 1937.

References

Lesticus
Beetles described in 1937